Tsholingkhar Gewog (Dzongkha: མཚོ་གླིང་མཁར་) is a gewog (village block) of Tsirang District, Bhutan.

References

Gewogs of Bhutan
Tsirang District